William P. O’Neill (7 February 1874 – 1955) was a politician from the U.S. state of Indiana. Between 1913 and 1917 he served as Lieutenant Governor of Indiana.

Life
William O’Neill was born in South Bend, St. Joseph County in Indiana. There is not much information available about him. He founded and published the Mishawaka Democrat which operated from 1891 through 1911. He joined the Democratic Party and in 1912 he was elected to the office of the Lieutenant Governor of Indiana. He served in this position between 13 January 1913 and 8 January 1917 when his term ended. In this function he was the deputy of Governor Samuel M. Ralston and he presided over the Indiana Senate.

William O’Neill died in 1955 in Mishawaka, St. Joseph County, in Indiana.

References

Literature
 Indiana, Past and Present. Volume 1. M. R. Hyman Company, Indianapolis, Ind., 1914, page 55.

External links
 The Political Graveyard

1874 births
1955 deaths
Lieutenant Governors of Indiana
Indiana Democrats